TÜBİTAK Space Technologies Research Institute or TÜBİTAK UZAY for short, is a Turkish institution carrying out research and development projects on space technology, electronics, information technology and related fields. It was established in 1985, under the name "Ankara Electronics Research and Development Institute" within the campus of Middle East Technical University (ODTÜ) in cooperation with the Scientific and Technological Research Council of Turkey (TÜBİTAK) and the university in Ankara. In 1995, the organization was renamed. Since 1998, the institute houses a new building in the campus.

TÜBİTAK UZAY specializes in space technologies, electronics, information technologies and related fields, keeping abreast of latest technological developments. The institute leads and takes part in R&D projects, aiming at having a pioneering role in the national research community, and assisting the industry in solving technical problems encountered during system design, selection and uses, product development and manufacturing in above mentioned specialization areas.

TÜBİTAK UZAY gives special emphasis on developing capability on small satellite design, manufacturing and test, leading Turkish Space Program, together with Turkish Aerospace Industries and Turkish Satellite Assembly, Integration and Test Center to initiate international collaboration in space technologies.

Turkey plans to build spaceport for launches of own space vehicles.

Research Areas

TÜBİTAK UZAY conducts its research and development activities in the following areas with a total of 235 staff members, out of which 151 are researchers and technical support personnel.
 Space Technologies: Satellite systems, satellite sub-systems, satellite ground station sub-systems, satellite test and integration systems.
 Electronics: Communication systems, electronics system design, electro-optic mission payload, high-speed digital design, IC design.
 Software: Computer vision, speech processing, pattern recognition, remote sensing, multimedia technologies, data mining, machine learning, natural language processing, artificial intelligence.
 Power Electronics: Power quality, compensation systems, electrical motor drives, switched-mode power supplies, renewable energy resources.
 Power Distribution Systems: Analysis of electric production and transmission systems, strategic research and development in distribution automation, Supervisory Control and Data Acquisition (SCADA) Systems, criteria setting for planning, design and operation of distribution systems.

Affiliations
TÜBİTAK UZAY is member of following institutions:

 Asia-Pacific Space Cooperation Organization (APSCO)
 International Society for Photogrammetry and Remote Sensing (ISPRS)
 Disaster Monitoring Constellation (DMC)
 Committee on Earth Observation Satellites (CEOS)
 Consultative Committee for Space Data Systems (CCSDS)
 EUROPRACTICE IC Service

Uzay in Numbers
Professional Background of Personnel at TÜBİTAK UZAY

Educational Background of Researchers

References

External links
Official website 

1985 establishments in Turkey
Research institutes established in 1985
Organizations based in Ankara
Middle East Technical University
Research institutes in Turkey
Space technology research institutes
Information technology research institutes
Space program of Turkey
Scientific and Technological Research Council of Turkey
Organizations established in 1985